North Dakota Highway 23 (ND 23) is a  east–west highway in northwestern North Dakota. ND 23's eastern terminus is at ND 41 near Velva, and its western terminus at U.S. Route 85 (US 85) in Watford City.

The only cities that ND 23 runs directly through are New Town and Watford City. It also runs through the unincorporated community of Keene. Other cities near the route include Makoti, Parshall, Plaza, Ryder, and Velva.

Route description
ND 23 has its western terminus at a junction with US 85 and ND 200 in Watford City. The route starts concurrently with U.S. Route 85 Business (US 85 Bus.) for a short distance. It starts running north for less than a mile, then east outside of the city limits. After leaving Watford City, the route intersects with the first section of ND 1806, to which it serves as the southern terminus. The route then turns due north for about six miles at an intersection with ND 73. ND 23 then runs north through the small community of Keene. After turning eastward once more, the route shares another intersection with ND 1806 serving as the southern terminus of its second section. ND 23 intersects with ND 22 before leaving McKenzie County and entering Mountrail County by crossing Lake Sakakawea on the Four Bears Bridge.

Just after entering Mountrail County, ND 23 has a junction with ND 1804 in New Town. This is the western end of a concurrency with ND 1804 in which ND 1804 is unsigned. Heading eastward seven more miles, the route serves as the southern terminus of ND 8. Just north of Parshall the route serves as the northern terminus of ND 37. This junction is also the eastern end of the route's concurrency with ND 1804. The route then runs three miles south of Plaza before entering Ward County.

Two miles east of the county line, ND 23 runs just north of Makoti. The highway then serves as the northern terminus of ND 28, a short route that connects ND 23 to the small city of Ryder. Ten miles north of Max and sixteen miles south of Minot, ND 23 intersects US 83 before entering McHenry County. In McHenry County the highway travels east for about fifteen miles before meeting its eastern terminus south of Velva at ND 41.

Major intersections

Special routes
ND 23 has three special routes.

Watford City business route

ND 23 Bus.'s western terminus is at U.S. Route 85 Business (US 85 Bus.) and ND 23 in Watford City, and the eastern terminus is at ND 23 and the southern terminus of ND 1806 in Watford City.

Major intersections

Watford City alternate

ND 23A's western terminus is at U.S. Route 85 Business (US 85 Bus.) and ND 23 Bus. in Watford City, and the eastern terminus is at ND 23 Bus. in Watford City.

Major intersections

New Town truck route

ND 23B Truck's western terminus is at ND 1804 north of New Town, and the eastern terminus is at ND 23 east of New Town.

Major intersections

See also

References

External links

 The North Dakota Highways Page by Chris Geelhart
 North Dakota Signs by Mark O'Neil

023
Transportation in McKenzie County, North Dakota
Transportation in Mountrail County, North Dakota
Transportation in McHenry County, North Dakota
Transportation in Ward County, North Dakota